The ATP Challenger Tour, known until the end of 2008 as the ATP Challenger Series, is a series of international men's professional tennis tournaments. The Challenger Tour events are the second-highest tier of tennis competition, behind the ATP Tour. The ITF World Tennis Tour tournaments are on the entry-level of international professional tennis competition. The ATP Challenger Tour is administered by the Association of Tennis Professionals. Players who succeed on the ATP Challenger Tour earn sufficient ranking points to become eligible for main draw or qualifying draw entry at ATP Tour tournaments. Players on the Challenger Tour are usually young players looking to advance their careers, those who fail to qualify for ATP events, or former ATP players looking to get back into the big tour.

History of challenger events
The first challenger events were held in 1978, with eighteen events taking place. Two were held on the week beginning January 8, one in Auckland and another in Hobart.  The next events were held one at a time beginning June 18 and ending August 18 in the following U.S. locations, in order: Shreveport, Birmingham, Asheville, Raleigh, Hilton Head, Virginia Beach, Wall, Cape Cod, and Lancaster. Events continued after a one-month hiatus with two begun September 24 and 25, one in Tinton Falls, New Jersey and in Lincoln, Nebraska respectively. The following week saw one event played, in Salt Lake City, then two played simultaneously in Tel Aviv and San Ramon, California, then one played the following week in Pasadena.  A final event was played a month later in Kyoto. In comparison, the 2008 schedule saw 178 events played in more than 40 countries.

Present-day prize money and ranking points

2023–present
In 2022, during the most numerous season in the tour's history, the ATP Tour announced an overhaul of the tournaments system from 2023 season. Challenger 110 and  Challenger 90 events were scrapped, Challenger 80 reduced to the Challenger 75 while the prize money requirements for it and Challenger 100 were increased. It also introduced the new highest category − Challenger 175 to be inaugurally held in the second week of Indian Wells, Rome and Madrid ATP Tour Masters 1000 events.

The new points system is as follows:

2009–2022
Challenger tournaments offer total prize money ranging from $30,000 up to $168,000+, which, along with whether the tournament provides hospitality (food and lodging) to the players, determines the number of points a player gets for winning each match in the tournament.Hospitality moves the points distribution up one level and the points to the overall winner range from 80 points for a $40,000 tournament to 125 points for a $220,000 tournament with hospitality. In contrast, the ATP-level tournaments offer total prize money from $400,000 to over $6 million and points to the overall winners from 250 to 1500.As a point of reference, player rankings are based on points accumulated in the previous 52 weeks, and as of February 2016, a player who has earned 550 points in the last 52 weeks would be ranked just below the 100th position. 250 points would get him a ranking just below 200th, while with 100 points he would get to around 425th, and 50 points would put him just below 600th. So rankings points earned in Challengers can help a low-ranked player to move up in the rankings quickly.

Player quality
Players have usually had success at the Futures tournaments of the ITF Men's Circuit before competing in Challengers. Due to the lower level of points and money available at the Challenger level, most players in a Challenger have a world ranking of 100 to 500 for a $35K tournament and 50 to 250 for a $150K tournament.An exception happens during the second week of a Grand Slam tournament, when top-100 players who have already lost in the Slam try to take a wild card entry into a Challenger tournament beginning that second week.

Tretorn Serie+
In February 2007, Tretorn became the official ball of the Challenger Series, and the sponsor of a new series consisting of those Challenger tournaments with prize money of $100,000 or more.  They renewed the sponsorship with the ATP in 2010 and extended it until the end of 2011.

Records

Most singles titles
Lu Yen-hsun has won 29 ATP Challenger Tour titles.

Oldest champions

Youngest champions

Most matches won
Updated

List of events
The Tampere Open is the longest running ATP Challenger event.

Challenger 125 ($150,000+H / €127,000+H) 
Aberto de São Paulo (2001–2014)
Arizona Tennis Classic
Abierto GNP Seguros
AON Open Challenger
Bengaluru Open
Busan Open Challenger
Città di Caltanissetta
Ethias Trophy (2005–2016)
Finaport Zug Open
Intersport Heilbronn Open (−2015)
Irving Tennis Classic
IsarOpen
Kaohsiung OEC Open
Kunming Open
Moneta Czech Open
Nur-Sultan Challenger
Open d'Orléans
Open du Pays d'Aix
Oracle Challenger Series – Chicago
Oracle Challenger Series – Houston
Oracle Challenger Series – Indian Wells
Oracle Challenger Series – Newport Beach
Pekao Szczecin Open
Rothesay Open Nottingham
Santaizi Challenger
Sparkassen Open

Challenger 110 ($150,000 / €127,000 / $125,000+H / €106,000+H) 
Abierto de Puebla (2016)
Brest Challenger
BNP Paribas Primrose Bordeaux
Fuzion 100 Ilkley Trophy
Lisheng Sports Cup Jinan International Open
Hua Hin Open Challenger (2015–2017)
Israel Open (2015–2016)
Kunming Challenger (2013)
Santo Domingo Open presented by Milex
Slovak Open
Surbiton Trophy
Yinzhou International Men's Tennis Challenger

Challenger 100 ($125,000 / $100,000+H / €106,000 / €85,000+H)
CDMX Open
China International Challenger Qingdao (2016–2017)
Geneva Open (1992–2014)
Hoff Open (2015–2016)
Honggutan China International Challenger Nanchang (2014–2016)
International Challenger Chengdu
Internationaux de Tennis de Vendée
Internazionali di Forlì
Internazionali di Monza e Brianza (2005–2012)
Open Castilla y León
Open de Guadeloupe
President's Cup
RBC Tennis Championships of Dallas
Sacramento Challenger (2005–2015)
San Marino GO&FUN Open (2001–2014, 2021)
Seoul Open Challenger
Soweto Open (2009–2013)
Srpska Open
Wrocław Open (2015–2017)

Other tournaments

Aberto de Brasília
Aberto de Florianópolis
Aberto de Tênis do Rio Grande do Sul
Aberto do Paraná de Tênis
Aberto Rio Preto
Aberto Santa Catarina de Tenis
Acqua Dolomia Tennis Cup
Adriatic Challenger
Advantage Cars Prague Open
Aegon GB Pro-Series Bath
Aegon GB Pro-Series Glasgow
Aegon Manchester Trophy
Aegon Nottingham Challenge
Aegon Pro-Series Loughborough
Aegon Trophy
Agri Cup
Alessandria Challenger
All Japan Indoor Tennis Championships
Almaty Challenger
Almaty Cup
American Express Istanbul Challenger
Antalya Challenger
Andria e Castel del Monte Challenger
Apis Canberra International
Aspria Tennis Cup
Astana Challenger Capital Cup
Astana Cup
Atlantic Tire Championships
ATP Challenger 2001 Team Padova
ATP Challenger Corrientes
ATP Challenger Pingguo
ATP Challenger Tour Finals
ATP Challenger Trophy
ATP Roller Open
ATP Salzburg Indoors
Bangkok Open I
Bangkok Open II
Bangkok Open III
Bangkok Open IV
Båstad Challenger
Batman Cup
Bauer Watertechnology Cup
Beijing International Challenger
BFD Challenger
BH Telecom Indoors
BH Tennis Open International Cup
Black Forest Open
BMW Tennis Championship
BRD Arad Challenger
BRD Brașov Challenger
BRD Timișoara Challenger
Bucher Reisen Tennis Grand Prix
Burnie International
Cachantún Cup (ATP)
Cairo Open
Calgary National Bank Challenger
Caloundra International
Camparini Gioielli Cup
Campeonato Internacional de Tênis de Campinas
Campeonato Internacional de Tenis de Santos
Campeonato Internacional de Tênis do Estado do Pará
Capri Watch Cup
Challenger ATP de Salinas Diario Expreso
Challenger Banque Nationale de Drummondville
Challenger Banque Nationale de Gatineau
Challenger Banque Nationale de Granby
Challenger Britania Zavaleta
Challenger Ciudad de Guayaquil
Challenger en Los Andes – Quito
Challenger La Manche
Challenger of Santa Clarita
Charles Sturt Adelaide International
Charlottesville Men's Pro Challenger
Chennai Open
China International Suzhou
Citta' di Vercelli – Trofeo Multimed
City of Onkaparinga Tennis Challenger
City of Playford Tennis International
Claro Open Barranquilla
Claro Open Cali
Claro Open Floridablanca
Claro Open Medellín
Columbus Challenger
Concurso Internacional de Tenis – San Sebastián
Concurso Internacional de Tenis – Vigo
Copa Agco Córdoba
Copa Ciudad de Tigre
Copa Gobierno de Córdoba
Copa Internacional de Tenis Total Digest
Copa Petrobras Santiago
Copa San Cristóbal
Copa San Juan Gobierno
Copa Sevilla
Delhi Open
Dunlop World Challenge
East Hotel Canberra Challenger
Emami Kolkata Open
Eskişehir Cup
Fergana Challenger
Forest Hills Clay Court Classic
Franken Challenge
GDD CUP International Challenger Guangzhou
Gimcheon Challenger
Guimarães Open
Guzzini Challenger
Gwangju Challenger
Hong Kong ATP Challenger
Hungarian Challenger Open
Hyōgo Noah Challenger
Indore Open ATP Challenger
International Challenger Quanzhou
International Challenger Zhangjiagang
Internationaux de Nouvelle-Calédonie
Internationaux de Tennis de Blois
Internazionali Città di Brescia
Internazionali di Manerbio – Trofeo Dimmidisì
Internazionali di Tennis Città di Perugia
Internazionali di Tennis Città di Vicenza
Internazionali di Tennis d'Abruzzo
Internazionali di Tennis dell'Umbria
Internazionali di Tennis di Bergamo
Internazionali di Tennis di Cortina
IPP Open
IS Open São Paulo
Isla de Gran Canaria – Ciudad de Telde
İzmir Cup
Jalisco Open
JSM Challenger of Champaign–Urbana
Karshi Challenger
Kazan Kremlin Cup
Kazan Summer Cup
Keio Challenger
Kentucky Bank Tennis Championships
Knoxville Challenger
Koblenz Open
Košice Open
KPIT MSLTA Challenger
Kunal Patel SF Open
Las Vegas Tennis Open
Latrobe City Traralgon Challenger
Launceston Tennis International
Lermontov Cup
Levene Gouldin & Thompson Tennis Challenger
Lima Challenger
Lisboa Belém Open
Manulife Singapore ATP Challenger
Marbella Open
Marburg Open
MasterCard Tennis Cup
Melbourne Challenger
Mersin Cup
Milo Open Bogotá
Milo Open Cali
Mordovia Cup
Morelos Open
Morocco Tennis Tour – Casablanca
Morocco Tennis Tour – Casablanca II
Morocco Tennis Tour – Kenitra
Morocco Tennis Tour – Marrakech
Morocco Tennis Tour – Meknes
Morocco Tennis Tour – Mohammedia
Morocco Tennis Tour – Rabat
Morocco Tennis Tour – Tanger
Movistar Open
Napa Valley Challenger
Naples ITG Challenger
Nature's Way Sydney Tennis International
Neckarcup
Nielsen Pro Tennis Championships
Nordic Naturals Challenger
NorthBay Healthcare Men's Pro Championships
Oberstaufen Cup
Odlum Brown Vancouver Open
Open BNP Paribas Banque de Bretagne
Open Citta' della Disfida
Open de la Réunion
Open de Rennes
Open Diputación Ciudad de Pozoblanco
Open Harmonie mutuelle
Open Sopra Steria de Lyon
Open Tarragona Costa Daurada
Penza Cup
Peugeot Tennis Cup
Philippine Open ATP Manila Challenger
Pingshan Open
Poprad-Tatry Challenger
Potchefstroom Open
Poznań Open
Prosperita Open
PTT İstanbul Cup
Punta Open
Racket Club Open
Rai Open
RC Hotel Open
Rijeka Open
Rio Quente Resorts Tennis Classic
Rio Tennis Classic
Riviera di Rimini Challenger
Road to the Shanghai Rolex Masters
Rome Garden Open
s Tennis Masters Challenger
Samarkand Challenger
Samsung Securities Cup
San Benedetto Tennis Cup
San Luis Open Challenger Tour
Sanremo Tennis Cup
São Léo Open
São Paulo Challenger de Tênis
Sarasota Open
Savannah Challenger
SDA Tennis Open
Seguros Bolívar Open Pereira
Shenzhen Longhua Open
Shriram Capital P.L. Reddy Memorial Challenger
Shymkent Challenger
Siberia Cup
Sibiu Open
Sicilia Classic
Slovenia Open
Sparkasse Challenger Val Gardena Südtirol
Sparta Prague Open
Sporting Challenger
Status Athens Open
Stockton Challenger
STRABAG Challenger Open
Svijany Open
TAC Cup China International Nanjing Challenger
Tallahassee Tennis Challenger
Tampere Open
The Tarka Challenger
Taroii Open de Tênis
Tashkent Challenger
TEAN International
Tempe Challenger
Tennis Championships of Maui
Tennislife Cup
Tetra Pak Tennis Cup
The Hague Open
Thindown Challenger Biella
Tianjin Health Industry Park
Tiburon Challenger
Togliatti Cup
Torino Challenger
Torneo Città di Como
Torneo Internacional Challenger León
Torneo de Mendoza
Torneo Omnia Tenis Ciudad Madrid
Trani Cup
Tretorn SERIE+ tournaments
Trofeo Paolo Corazzi
Trofeo Ricardo Delgado Aray
Trofeo Stefano Bellaveglia
Trophée des Alpilles
Tunis Open
Uruguay Open
USTA LA Tennis Open
UTC Open by Selena
Venice Challenge Save Cup
Verrazzano Open
Vietnam Open
Vilnius Open
Visit Panamá Cup de Chitré
Visit Panamá Tennis Cup
Vivo Tennis Cup
Voit Mexico City Open
Volkswagen Challenger
Winnipeg National Bank Challenger
Wolffkran Open
Wuhai Challenger
Yeongwol Challenger Tennis
Yugra Cup
Zagreb Open
Zhuhai Open

See also
2023 ATP Challenger Tour
ATP Challenger Tour 175
ATP Challenger Tour 125
ATP Tour
ITF Men's World Tennis Tour
WTA 125 tournaments

References

ATP 2010 Tretorn SERIE+
Entry Points and Prize Money Table
US Open Prize Money
Challengers not during the 2nd Week of a Grand Slam
Challenger Example from 2nd Week of French Open
Article mentioning Agassi's Las Vegas Challenger
Overview from ATPtennis.com

External links
Association of Tennis Professionals (ATP) official website
List of Upcoming/Past Challenger events

ATP Challenger Tour
Recurring sporting events established in 1978
Tennis tours and series
Association of Tennis Professionals
Men's tennis tournaments